Sreevidya Mullachery a.k.a. Sreevidya Nair is an Indian actress, model and YouTuber who predominantly works in Malayalam television and film industry. She is best known for the TV show Star Magic on Flowers TV. She has also sung a rap song, which went viral with nearly a million views on YouTube.

Personal life

Sreevidya was born in Perumbala, Kasaragod district, Kerala, as the daughter of Vasantha K Nair and Kunjambu Nair. She has an elder brother, Sreekanth M. She did her schooling at Government Higher Secondary School, Chemnad, Kasaragod. She graduated in Aviation from Airocis College of Aviation and Management, Kannur. After that, she joined as Air hostess but, she resigned for full time film career.

Sreevidya Mullachery got officially engaged to film director and script writer Rahul Ramachandran on January 22, 2023.

Career
She made her debut in the movie Campus Diary along with former Chief Minister of Kerala V. S. Achuthanandan, later she has acted in the several movies including Oru Kuttanadan Blog along with Mammootty and Anu Sithara and the movie Oru Pazhaya Bomb Kadha along with Bibin George and Prayaga Martin. 
She is best known for the TV show Star Magic on Flowers TV. In September 2021, she received a silver play button from YouTube.  She has acted as heroine alongside Dhyan Sreenivasan for her next movie Sathyam Mathrame Bodhippikkoo.

Filmography

Feature films

TV shows

Web series

Awards and honors
 She received YouTube Creator Awards - Silver play button recently.

References

External links

Living people
Actresses in Malayalam television
Indian television actresses
Television personalities from Kerala
Female models from Kerala
Actresses in Malayalam cinema
21st-century Indian actresses
Actresses from Kerala
Indian film actresses
Year of birth missing (living people)